An aerodrome reference point (ARP), in some countries airport reference point, is the designated geographical location of an aerodrome. The geographic coordinates of an ARP are part of an aerodrome's entry in the AIP.

Internationally, the rules governing the establishment of an aerodrome reference point are defined by the ICAO in section 2.2 of Annex 14 to the Convention on International Civil Aviation. They state that:

In the United States, the term airport reference point is used and defined as "the approximate geometric center of all usable runway surfaces",  computed as a weighted average of the end of runway coordinates.

References

Air navigation